Verrucous perforating collagenoma is a  very rare skin disorder which presents (clinically) with verrucous papules with a transepidermal elimination of collagen.

See also 
 Linear verrucous epidermal nevus
 List of cutaneous conditions

References 

Abnormalities of dermal fibrous and elastic tissue